Parounak H. Zelveian is a specialist in the field of arterial hypertension and sleep apnea and founder of the  Armenian Medical Association. .

Positions
 Director of National Institute of Health (since 2012)
 Head of Preventive Cardiology Center at L.A. Ohanesyan Institute of Cardiology (since 2007)
 Executive secretary of Armenian Cardiologists Association (since 2007)
 Chief cardiologist of Yerevan (since 2007)
 Deputy Director for Science of L.A. Ohanesyan Institute of Cardiology (since 2005)
 President of Armenian Medical Association (since its foundation in 2002).

References

1967 births
Living people
Armenian cardiologists
Yerevan State Medical University alumni
Physicians from Yerevan